The 1933 Milan–San Remo was the 26th edition of the Milan–San Remo cycle race and was held on 26 March 1933. The race started in Milan and finished in San Remo. The race was won by Learco Guerra.

General classification

References

1933
1933 in road cycling
1933 in Italian sport
March 1933 sports events